The men's 200 metre freestyle event at the 2020 Summer Olympics was held from 25 to 27 July 2021 at the Tokyo Aquatics Centre. There were 39 competitors from 30 nations, with the ultimate numbers determined through the ongoing selection process, including universality places.

Background

It was the event's 16th appearance, having been held in 1900 and 1904 and then at every edition since 1968.

The only finalist from the 2016 Games to return was fifth-place finisher Townley Haas of the United States, who did not make the final this time. Reigning Olympic champion and two-time reigning World Champion Sun Yang of China missed the Games due to a doping ban.

Qualification

 
The Olympic Qualifying Time for the event was 1:47.02. Up to two swimmers per National Olympic Committee (NOC) could automatically qualify by swimming that time at an approved qualification event. The Olympic Selection Time was 1:50.23. Up to one swimmer per NOC meeting that time was eligible for selection, allocated by world ranking until the maximum quota for all swimming events is reached. NOCs without a male swimmer qualified in any event could also use their universality place.

Competition format

The competition consisted of three rounds: heats, semifinals, and a final. The swimmers with the best 16 times in the heats advanced to the semifinals. The swimmers with the best 8 times in the semifinals advanced to the final. A swim-off were used to break a tie for advancement to the next round.

Records
Prior to this competition, the existing world and Olympic records were as follows.

No new records were set during the competition.

Schedule
The event was moved to a three-day schedule, with each round on separate, consecutive days.
All times are Japan Standard Time (UTC+9)

Results

Heats
The swimmers with the top 16 times, regardless of heat, advanced to the semifinals.

Swim-off

Semifinals
The swimmers with the best 8 times, regardless of heat, advanced to the final.

Final
200m freestyle final

References

Men's 00200 metre freestyle
Olympics
200 metre freestyle at the Olympics
Men's events at the 2020 Summer Olympics